Coriolanus is a 2011 British film adaptation of William Shakespeare's tragedy Coriolanus. It is directed by and stars Ralph Fiennes as the title character, with  Gerard Butler as Tullus Aufidius, Vanessa Redgrave as Volumnia, and Brian Cox as Menenius. This is Fiennes' directorial debut. It places Shakespeare's original text and plot into a contemporary, pseudo-Balkan setting (filmed in Serbia and Montenegro), reminiscent of the Yugoslav Wars.

Plot 
In Rome, riots are in progress after stores of grain are withheld from citizens and civil liberties are reduced due to a war between Rome and neighbouring Volsci. The rioters are particularly angry at Caius Martius, a brilliant Roman general whom they blame for the city's problems. During a march, the rioters encounter Martius, who is openly contemptuous and does not hide his low opinion of the regular citizens. The commander of the Volscian army, Tullus Aufidius, who has fought Martius on several occasions and considers him a mortal enemy, swears that the next time they meet in battle will be the last. Martius leads a raid against the Volscian city of Corioles and during the siege, with much of Martius's unit being killed, Martius gathers reinforcements and the Romans take the city. After the battle, Martius and Aufidius meet in single combat, which results in both men being wounded but ends when Aufidius' soldiers drag him away from the fight.

Martius returns to Rome victorious and in recognition of his great courage, General Cominius gives him the agnomen of "Coriolanus". Coriolanus's mother Volumnia encourages her son to run for consul within the Roman Senate. Coriolanus is reluctant but he eventually agrees to his mother's wishes. He easily wins the Roman Senate and seems at first to have won over the commoners as well due to his military victories. Two tribunes, Brutus and Sicinius, are critical of his entrance into politics, fearing that his popularity would lead to Coriolanus taking power away from the Senate for himself. They scheme to undo Coriolanus and so stir up another riot in opposition to him becoming consul. When they call Coriolanus a traitor, Coriolanus bursts into rage and openly attacks the concept of popular rule as well as the citizens of Rome, demonstrating that he still holds the plebeians in contempt. He compares allowing citizens to have power over the senators as to allowing "crows to peck the eagles". The tribunes term Coriolanus a traitor for his words and order him banished. Coriolanus retorts that it is he who will banish Rome from his presence: "There is a world elsewhere".

After being exiled from Rome, Coriolanus seeks out Aufidius in the Volscian capital of Antium and offers to let Aufidius kill him, to spite the country that banished him. Moved by his plight and honoured to fight alongside the great general, Aufidius and his superiors embrace Coriolanus and allow him to lead a new assault on the city, so that he can claim vengeance on the city which he feels betrayed him. Coriolanus and Aufidius lead a Volscian attack on Rome. Panicked, Rome sends General Titus to persuade Coriolanus to halt his crusade for vengeance; when Titus reports his failure, Senator Menenius follows but is also shunned. In response, Menenius, who has seemingly lost all hope in Coriolanus and Rome, commits suicide by a river bank. Finally, Volumnia is sent to meet with her son, along with Coriolanus' wife Virgilia and his son. Volumnia succeeds in dissuading her son from destroying Rome and Coriolanus makes peace between the Volscians and the Romans alongside General Cominius. When Coriolanus returns to the Volscian border, he is confronted by Aufidius and his men, who now also brand him as a traitor. They call him Martius and refuse to call him by his "stolen name" of Coriolanus. Aufidius explains to Coriolanus how he put aside his hatred so that they could conquer Rome but now that Coriolanus has prevented this, he has betrayed the promise between them. For this betrayal, Aufidius and his men attack and kill Coriolanus.

Cast

Production 

The film was produced on a budget of US $7.7 million. It was filmed in Belgrade and other areas of Serbia using many locals as extras, as well as Montenegro and the UK.

Release 
The film premiered in Competition at the 61st Berlin International Film Festival on 14 February 2011 and it opened the 2011 Belgrade International Film Festival. On 2 December of that year, it opened in New York City and Los Angeles. As of February 2012, it has not yet received a wide U.S. release. However, the film has been shown on a limited basis in other large US cities, such as Chicago. It received a full UK cinema release on 20 January 2012 after premiering at London's Curzon Mayfair cinema on 5 January.

Reception

Critical response 
Coriolanus received positive reviews. It holds an approval rating of 92% on Rotten Tomatoes based on 151 reviews, with an average rating of 7.38/10. The website's critical consensus states: "Visceral and visually striking, Ralph Fiennes' Coriolanus proves Shakespeare can still be both electrifying and relevant in a modern context." On Metacritic, the film has a weighted average score of 79 out of 100, based on 32 critics, indicating "generally favorable reviews".

Katherine Monk of The Vancouver Sun gave the film a rating of 3.5 out of 5, stating that "Coriolanus not only finds all the contemporary parallels, it reiterates the tragedy of the endlessly exploited patriot who hopes to earn love at the end of a barrel". Manohla Dargis of The New York Times wrote in her review, "Mr. Fiennes has made smart choices here, notably by surrounding himself with a strong secondary cast".

Accolades 
The film was nominated for Golden Berlin Bear award at the 61st Berlin International Film Festival. Ralph Fiennes was nominated for the BAFTA Award for Outstanding Debut by a British Writer, Director or Producer at the 65th British Academy Film Awards.

Home media 
Coriolanus was released by Anchor Bay Home Entertainment on DVD and Blu-ray in the United States on 29 May 2012. Both home media formats of the film contain director commentary with Ralph Fiennes and a behind-the-scenes featurette entitled The Making of Coriolanus. The film was later released on DVD and Blu-ray in the United Kingdom by Lionsgate Films on 4 June 2012, containing the same director commentary audio track but replacing the Making of… featurette with Behind The Scenes of Coriolanus with Will Young.

See also 
 Roman-Volscian wars
 Richard III (1995), a film also adapted from a Shakespearean play, but with the setting placed in the 1930s.

References

External links

 
 
 
 Coriolanus at D Films
 Coriolanus at ScreenDaily.com

Films based on Coriolanus
2011 films
Films directed by Ralph Fiennes
Films scored by Ilan Eshkeri
Films set in Rome
Films shot in Serbia
British independent films
Modern adaptations of works by William Shakespeare
Films with screenplays by John Logan
Icon Productions films
Films shot in Montenegro
2011 directorial debut films
2011 drama films
2010s English-language films
2010s British films